The Archdeacon of Dudley is one of two archdeacons in the Anglican Diocese of Worcester, England (the other being the Archdeacon of Worcester).

History
The archdeaconry of Dudley was created by Order in Council on 11 February 1921 from the Worcester archdeaconry and named after the town of Dudley. It consists of the deaneries of Bromsgrove, Droitwich, Dudley, Kidderminster, Kingswinford, Stourbridge and Stourport.

The present Archdeacon of Dudley is the Venerable Nikki Groarke, formerly vicar of St Stephen's Church, Canonbury, Islington, in the Diocese of London; she is the first woman to hold the post and was installed on 5 January 2014.

List of archdeacons
1921–1934 (d.): Sydney James
1934–1951 (ret.): Arthur Shepherd (afterwards archdeacon emeritus)
1951–1968 (ret.): Alfred Hurley (afterwards archdeacon emeritus)
1968–1975 (res.): John Williams (afterwards Archdeacon of Worcester)
1976–1984 (res.): Christopher Campling (afterwards Dean of Ripon)
1985–1986 (res.): Robin Bennett
1987–2001 (ret.): John Gathercole
2001–September 2013 (ret.): Fred Trethewey
2014-present: Nikki Groarke

Deaneries, rural deans and lay chairs as of 2019

See also
Bishop of Worcester
Worcester Cathedral

References

External links
Worcester Diocesan website
Church of England Statistics 2002

Lists of Anglicans
Christianity in Worcestershire
Dudley
 
Anglican Diocese of Worcester